Abdullah Mehsud (1977 – 
24 July 2007) was a Pashtun militant commander who killed himself with a hand grenade after security forces raided his dwelling in Zhob, Balochistan, Pakistan. He belonged to the Mahsud tribe.

American authorities later claimed that he had originally been a prisoner in the Guantanamo bay detainment camps, who was judicially released and subsequently "returned to terrorism".

Early life 
Abdullah Mehsud (Muhammad Alam Mahsud) was born in 1977 in Nano village of South Waziristan, and was a Pashtun, part of the fierce the Mehsud tribe, Saleemi Khel clan in South Waziristan which is the homeland of the Meshud tribe located in North West Pakistan. Abdullah Mehsud fought against the Northern Alliance and lost a leg to a landmine in 1996.

Capture 
During the opening days of Operation Enduring Freedom, Mehsud fought against U.S. and Northern Alliance forces in Afghanistan. In December 2001, he surrendered to the Uzbek warlord Abdul Rashid Dostum in the Battle of Kunduz. He was handed over to the U.S. and spent 25 months in Guantanamo Bay detention camp, where he was fitted with a prosthetic limb. He was released by the U.S. and returned to South Waziristan.

Return to the battlefield 
After his release, Mehsud immediately begin rebuilding his Pakistani Taliban (Tehrik-i-Taliban Pakistan/TTP) cadre. He commanded a force of up to 5,000 Taliban fighters. He then began initiating attacks on coalition soldiers in Afghanistan.

In Waziristan, Mehsud was believed to be behind the kidnapping of two Chinese engineers from the building of the Gomal Zam Dam, which left one hostage dead during a botched rescue attempt. He was also alleged to have been behind an attack on Pakistan's Interior Minister Aftab Ahmad Sherpao that killed 31 people.

In March 2005, a Department of Defense document claimed:

In 2005, Pakistani President Pervez Musharraf announced that Mehsud had been killed by ISI forces, only to later retract the statement.

Mehsud was one of the first three former Guantanamo captives the Bush Presidency reported had returned to the battlefield.  As of July 2007, spokesmen reported that over thirty captives had returned to the battlefield, or associated with terrorists, after their release.  As of July 2007, the spokesmen had named seven of those individuals.

Promise to never surrender 
Sikh Spectrum reported that during a telephone interview in 2004, Abdullah Mehsud promised to never surrender.

Death 
On 24 July 2007, Mehsud was at a house with other militants in Zhob, Balochistan. A team of Pakistani law enforcement agencies conducted a raid on the house where he was staying. Mehsud killed himself by detonating a hand grenade. During the raid, several other militants were killed, Abdul Rahman Mehsud and Muhammad Azam, were captured along with a local Pakistani Taliban leader.

Relationship with Baitullah Mehsud 
Abdullah Mehsud has been described as a brother of Baitullah Mehsud, a tribal leader of the Waziri Mehsud tribe.
Other sources merely assert that they were clansmen, or associates.
Islam Online reports that Baitullah suspected that Abdullah was a double agent.

Defense Intelligence Agency claims he "returned to terrorism" 
The Defense Intelligence Agency asserted Abdullah Mahsud had "returned to terrorism".
The DIA reported:

References

External links 
 

1977 births
2007 deaths
Tehrik-i-Taliban Pakistan members
Guantanamo detainees known to have been released
Suicides in Pakistan
Pashtun people
People from South Waziristan
Suicides by explosive device
2007 suicides